Mount Irish is a summit in the Mount Irish Range, in the U.S. state of Nevada.

Mount Irish has the name of O. H. Irish, an Indian Affairs agent.

References

Mountains of Lincoln County, Nevada